is a former Japanese football player. She played for the Japan national team.

Club career
Konno was born in Chiba Prefecture on October 10, 1980. She played for her local club, JEF United Chiba. She retired at the end of the 2010 season.

National team career
On May 11, 2010, when Konno was 29 years old, she played for the Japan national team against Mexico.

National team statistics

References

External links
JEF United Chiba

1980 births
Living people
Association football people from Chiba Prefecture
Japanese women's footballers
Japan women's international footballers
Nadeshiko League players
JEF United Chiba players
Women's association football midfielders